Herbert Charles Brown  (18741940) was a senior Australian public servant best known for his time as Commonwealth Auditor-General in the late 1930s.

Life and career
Brown was born in 1874, and joined the New South Wales public service in 1891.

Brown served for 12-years in the Postmaster-General's Department, before joining the Department of Home Affairs. He then became an Assistant Secretary in the Department of Works and Railways, then a chief clerk and accountant in the Prime Minister's Department.

In 1928, Brown was appointed Secretary of the Department of Markets. He became Secretary of the expanded Department of Markets and Transport at the end of that year.

Brown was Secretary of the Department of Transport between 1930 and 1932. His salary was initially set at £1,100 per year, and his responsibilities included Commonwealth railways, assisted Migration from Britain, and lighthouses, light ships, beacons and buoys.

When the Department of the Interior was created in 1932, amalgamating the Departments of Home Affairs, Transport and Works and Railways, Brown was appointed to be its head. Having served as head of the Department of the Interior for over three years, Brown was appointed Commonwealth Auditor-General in November 1935.

Brown died on 16 July 1940, aged 67. His death was at home after a short illness.

Awards
Brown was made a Commander of the Order of the British Empire in June 1933 whilst Secretary of the Department of the Interior.

References

1874 births
1940 deaths
Australian public servants
Australian Commanders of the Order of the British Empire